The name world circus may refer to:

 World Circus, a 1987 album from the rock group Toxik
 World Circus (circus), a circus group based in Switzerland
 World Circus Sideshow, a former sideshow on Coney Island